Wyoming High School (WHS) is a public high school located in Wyoming, Ohio, a suburb of Cincinnati.  The school is operated by the Wyoming City School District, in Hamilton County. The district serves students from the city of Wyoming and parts of surrounding Springfield Township. 

Wyoming High School was ranked the 3rd best Ohio high school by US News in 2022. The school received a score of 84.2 out of 100. The school has scored above an 80 five out of the last seven years. In 2015 Wyoming placed 4th in the state with a score of 73.5. Wyoming was ranked number 1 in the state on the Ohio 2006 State Report Card, with a performance index rating of 108.6. In 2009, it was ranked 70th in Newsweek Magazine's Top 1200 Schools in the nation.

The motto of Wyoming High School is "Where Excellence Becomes a Way of Life."

Academics
Wyoming offers students a challenging curriculum, including many select Advanced Placement classes. These include AP Environmental Science, AP Biology, AP Chemistry, AP Physics 1, AP Physics C: Mechanics, AP Studio Art, AP English Language and Composition, AP English Literature and Composition, AP French Language and Culture, AP Spanish Language and Culture, AP Latin, AP Statistics, AP Calculus, AP Computer Science Principles, AP Computer Science A, AP Microeconomics, AP Macroeconomics, AP Psychology, AP United States History, AP Comparative Government and Politics, and a world-renowned AP United States Government and Politics program. Wyoming's class of 2004 was ranked first among medium sized schools in the subject.

Wyoming offers various music opportunities, including three string orchestras, a band, and multiple choir programs. There are also many other courses offered in the visual arts, such as Computer Graphics and Photography, as well as three separate AP art classes.

Spanish, French, and Latin are offered in five separate levels at Wyoming. Each language has levels I, II, III, IV, and V (AP), available to every student.

Extracurriculars

Also of note is Wyoming's outstanding drama program, which is based in the Pendery Center Auditorium, a state-of-the-art facility that was completed in the year 2000. Two full length plays and one musical are presented each year. Recent productions include Miracle Worker (2017), Games Afoot (2017), Sound of Music (2017), and Merry Wives of Winsor (2016).

Often placing at competitions of each, Wyoming's Latin Club functions as a local chapter of both the Ohio Junior Classical League (OJCL) and National Junior Classical League (NJCL).

As of January 2020, the list of extra-curricular activities was as follows:

 Academic Team
 The Alliance (GSA)
 AVID
 Brass Ensemble
 Brothers & Sisters United
 Chamber Music WHS
 Chess Club
 Club HOPE (Help Our Planet Earth)
 Color Guard/Flag Corps
 Drama Club
 Dungeons and Dragons Club
 Engineering Club
 French Club
 GLEE Club
 Horizon (School Newspaper)
 INTERalliance Club
 Icarus (Student Literary Magazine)
 Jazz Ensemble
 JETS – TEAMS
 Latin Club
 Mock Trial
 Model United Nations
 Political Discourse Club
 Photography Club
 Positive Psychology
 Project L.E.A.D.
 Robotics Club
 Science Olympiad
 Spanish Club
 Student Council
 Ultimate Frisbee
 Women in STEM
 Yearbook Committee

WYOMUN

First established in 2014, WYOMUN is a Model United Nations conference run by the Wyoming High School Model United Nations Club. The conference annually hosts over 250 high school and middle school students from around the Greater Cincinnati Area. Its seventh iteration happened on October 31, 2020, and its eighth iteration is scheduled for October 30, 2021.

WYOMUN has featured a host of committees including the World Health Organization, the United Nations High Commissioner for Refugees, and the League of Nations. WYOMUN has also featured non-UN crisis committees on a variety of topics such as the Vietnam War, the Chicano Movement, the Kingdom of Kamehameha, the Arab Spring and the Seven Years' War, and has occasionally ventured into pop culture with a committee on Stranger Things from Netflix, as well as one on the Harry Potter series.

Each year, WYOMUN invites keynote speakers to address its delegates during opening ceremonies. Notable recent speakers have been Ohio Senator Sherrod Brown, President of the Puerto Rican Senate and current gubernatorial candidate Eduardo Bhatia, and Indiana University Maurer School of Law Vice President of International Affairs Hannah L. Buxbaum. The keynote speaker for WYOMUN VII was the distinguished former ambassador Thomas Boyatt.

Athletics
Wyoming is a long time member of the Cincinnati Hills League (CHL), a very competitive small school league in the Cincinnati area. 

Other CHL member schools include:
Deer Park High School
Finneytown High School
Indian Hill High School
Madeira High School
Reading High School
Taylor High School
Mariemont High School. 

Wyoming offers 24 varsity sports, which include:

Varsity sports

 Fall
 Football
 Men's Soccer
 Women's Soccer
 Volleyball
 Men's Golf
 Women's Golf
 Women's Tennis
 Cross Country (co-ed)
 Cheerleading (Football)
 Winter
 Men's Basketball
 Women's Basketball
 Swimming (co-ed)
 Diving (co-ed)
 Wrestling
 Indoor Track (Club) (co-ed)
 Bowling (co-ed)
 Cheerleading (Basketball)
 Spring
 Track and Field (co-ed)
 Men's Tennis
 Men's Lacrosse
 Women's Lacrosse
 Baseball
 Softball

Cincinnati Hills League all sports championships
The CHL All-Sports trophy is awarded to the school within the Cincinnati Hills League that has had the most successful overall athletic program in the school year. The years Wyoming has won the All-Sports trophy:

2001, 2002, 2003, 2004, 2005, 2006, 2007, 2008, 2009, 2010, 2011, 2012, 2013, 2014, 2015, 2016, 2019, 2021

Ohio High School Athletic Association State Championships

 Boys Football – 1977, 2018 
 Boys Track and Field – 1950
 Girls Basketball – 1996
 Boys Soccer - 2021

Notable alumni
 William G. Bowen, former president, Princeton University and the Andrew W. Mellon Foundation
 Thomas D. Boyatt, former U.S. Ambassador to Burkina Faso (1978–1980) and Colombia (1980–1983)
 Robert Brewster, American football player
 Deena Deardurff, American swimmer, 1972 Olympic Gold medalist in 4 × 100 m medley.
 John R. Fox, 1st Lieutenant, United States Army, Posthumous awarded the Congressional Medal of Honor for bravery in Italy during the Second World War.
 Bob Goodridge, American football player
 William Greider, writer
 B. Todd Jones, chief disciplinary officer of the National Football League, former Director of Bureau of Alcohol, Tobacco, Firearms and Explosives  former U.S. Attorney (Minnesota); partner at Robins, Kaplan, Miller & Ciresi
 Ruston Kelly, singer-songwriter
 C.F. Payne, illustrator
 David Payne, USA Track Team member (2008) Olympic Silver Medalist
 John Weld Peck II, judge
 Ahmed Plummer, American football player
 P. J. Pope, American football player
 Jeff Russell, baseball player
 David Shenk, writer
 Sean Smith, American football player
 Tracy Smith, TV personality
 John Terlesky, actor and director
 Otto Warmbier (Class of 2013, Salutatorian), American college student who was imprisoned in North Korea in 2016 on a charge of subversion
 Lance Williams, reporter, writer (co-author Game of Shadows)
 Michael Wolfe, poet, author, and award-winning filmmaker Muhammad: Legacy of a Prophet

References

External links
 
 District Website
 CHL Sports
 Icarus Website (WHS literary magazine)

High schools in Hamilton County, Ohio
Buildings and structures in Wyoming, Ohio
Public high schools in Ohio